Sal Viscuso (born October 5, 1948 in Brooklyn, New York) is an American actor. He is best known for the role of Father Timothy Flotsky in Soap (1977-1981).

Acting career

He is known for playing the character Father Timothy Flotsky on the television series Soap, a Roman Catholic priest struggling with his vow of celibacy. He appeared in the movies Spaceballs and The Taking of Pelham One Two Three. Viscuso appeared in four different roles on the sitcom Barney Miller. He has appeared in Diagnosis: Murder alongside Dick Van Dyke. He also played several weeks of the game show Pyramid with Dick Clark from 1977 to 1981.

Viscuso was one of two regular public address announcers in the series M*A*S*H. The more commonly heard voice was that of actor Todd Susman.

He played the recurring role of "Bobby Bigmouth" on the TV series, Lois & Clark: The New Adventures of Superman

Education
Viscuso is a graduate of Hiram W. Johnson High School in Sacramento, California. At Johnson, he participated in student government. He attended University of California, Davis where he was active in theater.

References

External links

1948 births
20th-century American male actors
American male film actors
American male television actors
Living people
Male actors from New York City
People from Brooklyn
University of California, Davis alumni